The official holidays in Turkey are established by the Act 2429 of 19 March  1981 that replaced the Act 2739 of 27 May 1935. These holidays can be grouped in national and religious holidays, which in total equals to 15 days of public holiday.

List

Available holidays

Former holidays

Minority holidays 
On May 2021 Erdoğan announced a new Human Rights Action Plan. According to the plan "public and private sector staff and students will be allowed to take leave for the religious holidays that they observe, regardless of their faith."

References

 
Holidays
Turkey